Jake Garn Airport  was a privately owned public-use airport 3 nautical miles (6 km) southwest of the central business district of Eagle Mountain, a city in Utah County, Utah, United States. The airport opened in May 2000 and closed in 2018.

Facilities and aircraft 

In 2007 the airport had an average of 82 general aviation aircraft operations per week, of which 95% were local and 5% were transient.

References

External links 
 Aerial image of site in 1997, prior to construction of airport from USGS The National Map
 Aeronautical chart at SkyVector

Defunct airports in the United States
Airports in Utah
Transportation in Utah County, Utah